Hari Krishna Shastri (1938-1997) was an Indian politician who was a Minister in the Government of India. He was a member of Fourth (1967, from Allahabad), Seventh (1980, from Fatehpur) and Eighth Lok Sabha. He was the losing candidate from Fatehpur in 1989 general election.

Personal life
He was the son of former Prime Minister Lal Bahadur Shastri.

References

Indian National Congress politicians from Uttar Pradesh
1938 births
1997 deaths
Politicians from Allahabad
India MPs 1967–1970
India MPs 1980–1984
India MPs 1984–1989
Lok Sabha members from Uttar Pradesh
People from Fatehpur district
Children of prime ministers of India